Alexis Palisson (born 9 September 1987) is a French rugby union footballer. He plays as a fullback and wing.

Career 
He currently plays for Colomiers in the French Pro D2. He made his international debut for France on 28 June 2008 against the Wallabies. He also represented France in an U19 competition in Dubai.

He played as France reached the 2011 Rugby World Cup Final in New Zealand. In May 2013 he started as Toulon won the 2013 Heineken Cup Final by 16–15 against Clermont Auvergne.

Controversy

This caused controversy in New Zealand, with some Māori people saying that Palisson was being disrespectful to their culture and that permission should have been sought from a particular  as the  usually represents  affiliation. Palisson was eventually forced to apologise for any offence caused and stressed that he respects tattoo traditions.

International tries

References

External links
 Profile at ESPNscrum 
 Fiche d'Alexis Palisson, sur cabrive-rugby.com
 
 

1987 births
Living people
People from Montauban
French rugby union players
Rugby union fullbacks
Rugby union wings
CA Brive players
RC Toulonnais players
Stade Toulousain players
Lyon OU players
Stade Français players
US Colomiers players
France international rugby union players
Sportspeople from Tarn-et-Garonne